Sberna is a surname found in the Swiss-Italian and Franco-Provençal regions. It may be of Celtic origin.

Etymology
The name is derived from the Celtic word vern, gwern or berula (berle), meaning "alder tree" or place of alders. The name indicates a Celtic person who lived where alders grew. The etymology seems to be very old and dates back to the time of Gaul, which was inhabited by Celtic tribes.

In the Romansh language spoken in the Cantons of Grisons (Graubünden) and Ticino in Switzerland and in Lombardy (Italy), the word appears as s'bèrna and bèrna, with the accent over the letter "e". Its dialectal meaning is "skinny and ugly" (magro e brutto in Italian), indicating that the name derives from a physical appellation of people, although that is only a hypothesis.

The Eastern Alpine dialect is also spoken in parts of Sicily, having been introduced by the Vikings at the time of the Norman Conquest (Viking). According to Gerhard Rohlfs the name derives from a Sicilian word sberna which meant "alder" whereas for  it means big cloth cover (cf. burnous).

Variant forms
Related surnames are "Vernon" in the English-speaking world, and "Bernaz" in the Chablais.

References 

Surnames of Italian origin
Rhaeto-Romance surnames